Saitoella complicata is a rare fungus that is one of the nearest relatives of S. pombe, a widely used model species. While related fungi are pathogens of plants or animals, S. complicata feeds on decaying matter. Its genome has been sequenced by the Joint Genome Institute.

References 

Taphrinomycetes
Fungi described in 1987